Kilmurry Ibrickane can refer to

 Kilmurry Ibrickane (Catholic parish)
 Kilmurry Ibrickane (civil parish)
 Kilmurry Ibrickane GAA